Sir Francis Jones (1559–1622) was an English merchant who was Lord Mayor of London in 1620.

Career
Jones was a city of London merchant and a member of the Worshipful Company of Haberdashers. On 18 July 1610, he was elected an alderman of the City of London for Aldgate ward.  He was Sheriff of London for the period 1610 to 1611, and also  Master of the Haberdashers Company from 1610 to 1611. He was Master of the Haberdashers again for 1613 to 1614 and for 1616 to 1617. He was knighted on 12 March 1617. In 1620 he was elected Lord Mayor of London and was Master of the Haberdashers Company again for 1620 to 1621.

Family
Sir Francis was the son of John Jones of Cleverley in Shropshire. He married twice and had three sons and a daughter by his first wife. They lived in London and at his country estate at Welford Park in Berkshire, which he bought in 1618 from the Parry family.

References

1559 births
1622 deaths
Sheriffs of the City of London
17th-century lord mayors of London
People from West Berkshire District
Haberdashers